Mae Sot is a city in western Thailand that shares a border with Myanmar to the west. It is notable as a trade hub and for its substantial population of Burmese migrants and refugees. The city is part of Tak Province, 87 km from the city of Tak and 492 km from Bangkok. It is home to the district headquarters of Mae Sot District, and is the main gateway between Thailand and Burma. As a result, it has gained notoriety for its trade in gems and teak, as well as black market services such as human trafficking and illicit drugs.

History
In 1937 Mae Sot was a local administration, administered by a headman, usually called village headman or village chief ( phu yai ban), 
Its population at the time was approximately 12,000 people. On 30 September 1939 Mae Sot was established as a municipalitity and governed 27 villages. It was upgraded to a city municipality in 2010.

In 1997, the Thai–Myanmar Friendship Bridge opened across the Moei River connecting Mae Sot with Myawaddy. In the 2000s, an additional large border crossing facility to handle goods traffic was built to the north west of Mae Sot with a crossing entitled No. 2 Friendship Bridge.

In recent decades, the city has become home to thousands of Burmese migrants. Industries in Mae Sot have grown, especially in the areas related to international trade and manufacturing in textiles, garments, gemstones, jade and teak. By 2004, the numbers of Burmese migrants in Mae Sot had reached between 70,000 and 100,000.

Geography
The neighboring districts of Mae Sot include Mae Pa tambon administrative organization (TAO) in the north, Mae Tao (TAO) to the south, Mae Pa and Phra That Pha Daeng (TAO) to the east, and the Tha Sai Luat Sub-district Municipality to the west.

Economy 

Trade with Burma constitutes the largest portion of Mae Sot's economy. It has an established market for commodities such as wholesale gems and teak. Most of the town's service industries are supported by Burmese migrants who work in sweat-shops and factories throughout the region. The town also suffers from a black market in illegal smuggling, human trafficking, and narcotics. The Thai-Myanmar Friendship Bridge is the primary gateway for trade with Burma. The border region, several kilometres west from central Mae Sot, includes the Rim Moei Market that deals in imported goods and woodwork.

Gen Prayut Chan-o-cha, the junta leader and prime minister, in May 2015 invoked his authority under Section 44 of the Interim Charter to declare the area of Wang Takhian in Tha Sai Luat subdistrict of Mae Sot a special economic zone (SEZ). The current plan is to transform nearly 2,200 rai of land of Tha Sai Luat into an SEZ. The government has offered to compensate displaced villagers at 7,000-12,000 baht per rai of land and resettle villagers in another district of Tak.  the current market price of a rai of land in Mae Sot is almost one million baht, leading villagers to reject the offer.

Climate
Mae Sot has a tropical savanna climate (Köppen climate classification Aw). Winters are dry and very warm. The monsoon season runs from May to October, with heavy rain and somewhat cooler temperatures during the day, although nights remain warm.

References

External links

Populated places in Tak province
Cities and towns in Thailand
Myanmar–Thailand border crossings